Olympia Ice Center is a 2,200-seat hockey rink in West Springfield, Massachusetts. It is currently home to the Western New England University men's and woman's ice hockey teams.  The teams compete in the Commonwealth Coast Conference of the NCAA III.  It was home to the American International College Yellow Jackets men's ice hockey team from 1998 to 2016. The team began playing at the venue when they moved to Division I for ice hockey in 1998.  It is located approximately six miles from the AIC campus.  The building has two other ice surfaces for use as practice facilities or for local teams and also serves as an alternative site for Springfield College once to three times per season.

External links
 Olympia Ice Center website

Indoor arenas in Massachusetts
College ice hockey venues in the United States
Indoor ice hockey venues in Massachusetts
West Springfield, Massachusetts
1998 establishments in Massachusetts
Sports venues completed in 1998
Sports venues in Hampden County, Massachusetts